The Vafa Mortar is a 160 mm mortar manufactured in Iran.

History 
The Vafa Mortar was unveiled during a National Defense Industry Day ceremony in Tehran, Iran on August 21, 2012.

Specifications 
It is a 160 mm mortar. Iranian Defense Minister Ahmad Vahidi claimed the mortar is capable of firing five to eight projectiles per minute.

References 

Mortars of Iran
160 mm mortars
Military equipment introduced in the 2010s